Somebody's Image was a short lived rock and pop Australian band, most famous for the Joe South's cover "Hush" which peaked at number 15 in Australia in 1967.

History
In 1966, the fledgling band began hanging around gigs by The Groop, who were a favourite of Melbourne pop fans during 1966. Eventually, the group played their first live gig, which was headlined by The Groop. The new group immediately attracted the attention of their future mentors, particularly keyboardist Brian Cadd and singer Ronnie Charles. Somebody's Image quickly developed a strong following at Melbourne's premier venues and it wasn't long before the band came to the notice of Go-Set staff writer Ian Meldrum, who was already championing The Groop relentlessly in his columns. Meldrum took over as their manager.

Somebody's Image began their recording career with the single "Heat Wave" a cover of the Martha and the Vandellas song, but it failed to chart. Their second single was a version of Joe South's "Hush" which peaked at number #15. With Meldrum's support and hard work promoting the band, he helped them to secure a firmer recording deal with EMI Records. The band released "Hide and Seek" in 1968 which peaked at number #32.

In September 1968, Morris and Meldrum left the band and they recruited new singer/guitarist Brian Holloway (ex The Dream), but the band parted ways in 1969.

Members
 Russell Morris (vocals), 
 Les Allan, aka Les Gough (bass), 
 Eric Cairns (drums), 
 Ronnie Charles (occasional vocals), 
 Brian Holloway (vocals, gtr: post-Morris), 
 Phillip Raphael (guitar), 
 Kevin Thomas (guitar)

Discography

Singles
 September 1967 "Heat Wave"
 November 1967 "Hush" Australia #15
 April 1968 "Hide And Seek" Australia #32

Awards and nominations

Go-Set Pop Poll
The Go-Set Pop Poll was coordinated by teen-oriented pop music newspaper, Go-Set and was established in February 1966 and conducted an annual poll during 1966 to 1972 of its readers to determine the most popular personalities.

|-
| 1968
| themselves 
| Best Australian Group
| 4th
|-

References

Musical groups from Melbourne
Musical groups established in 1966
Musical groups disestablished in 1969
Australian pop rock groups